Boggomsbaai is a coastal holiday village in Mossel Bay Municipality in the Western Cape province of South Africa.

Located in the center of the bay called Vleesbaai, the village is accessed by a single road, approximately 28.8 km from Mossel Bay Municipality.
Primarily a holiday destination, only a quarter of the houses are occupied on a full-time basis.
Businesses in the area vary between a dozen or so bed & breakfast accommodations and a golf-club.
There are no other shops in Boggomsbaai.

This small village contains two public gangways to access the beach.
The bay is known for whales and dolphins, who use the bay as a feeding ground.

Boggomsbaai has a self-contained nature reserve within it, which comprises small reptiles and mammals such as tortoise, guinea fowl, rabbit & small antelope.

References

Populated places in the Mossel Bay Local Municipality